Maksim Vyacheslavovich Petrov (born 18 January 2001) is a Russian footballer playing as a midfielder for Alania Vladikavkaz on loan from Lokomotiv Moscow. He is mostly used as a winger, after playing most of his junior career in a central midfielder position.

Club career
He made his Russian Premier League debut for FC Lokomotiv Moscow on 11 September 2021 in a game against PFC Krylia Sovetov Samara. He made his European debut on 30 September 2021 in an Europa League game against Lazio.

On 29 August 2022, Petrov was loaned to Alania Vladikavkaz.

Career statistics

Club

Notes

References

External links

2001 births
People from Balashikha
Sportspeople from Moscow Oblast
Living people
Russian footballers
Russia youth international footballers
Association football midfielders
FC Lokomotiv Moscow players
Russian Premier League players
Russian First League players
Russian Second League players